Billingsley may refer to:

Billingsley-Band

People 
 Billingsley (surname)

Places 
 Billingsley, Alabama, a town in the United States
 Billingsley, Band, rock band of brothers, from Western North Carolina
 Billingsley, Shropshire, a village in England
 Billingsley Farm, a historic place in Wadesboro, Florida, United States
 Billingsley Road, in Charles County, Maryland, United States

Other 
 USS Billingsley (DD-293), a destroyer in the United States Navy following World War I

See also